Maoula is a village in the Yaho Department of Balé Province in southwestern Burkina Faso. The village has a population of 578.

References

External links
Satellite map at Maplandia.com

Populated places in the Boucle du Mouhoun Region
Balé Province